Fattail scorpion or fat-tailed scorpion is the common name given to scorpions of the genus Androctonus, one of the most dangerous groups of scorpion species in the world.  The genus was first described in 1828 by Christian Gottfried Ehrenberg.

They are found throughout the semi-arid and arid regions of the Middle East and Africa. They are moderate sized scorpions, attaining lengths of 10 cm (just under 4 in). Their common name is derived from their distinctly fat metasoma, or tail, while the Latin name originates from Greek and means "man killer". Their venom contains powerful neurotoxins and is especially potent. Stings from Androctonus species are known to cause several human deaths each year. Several pharmaceutical companies manufacture an antivenom for treatment of Androctonus envenomations.

Geographic range 
Androctonus is widespread in North and West Africa, the Middle East and eastwards to the Hindukush region. Countries where Androctonus species live include:  Egypt, Palestine, Israel, India, Lebanon, Turkey, Jordan, Saudi Arabia, Yemen, Oman, United Arab Emirates, Qatar, Kuwait, Iraq, Iran, Afghanistan, Bahrain, Pakistan and Morocco.

Etymology 
A rough English translation of the name Androctonus is "man-killer", from the Ancient Greek anḗr, andrós (ἀνήρ, ἀνδρός), meaning "man" and kteínein (κτείνειν), meaning "to kill". Crassicauda means fat-tailed, from the Latin crassus meaning "fat" and cauda, meaning "tail". Androctonus crassicauda is widespread throughout the Middle East and its name means "fat-tailed man-killer". Similarly, the Latin word for South is australis, from which Androctonus australis, "southern man-killer", derives.

Taxonomy 

Taxonomic reclassification is ongoing, sources tending to disagree on the number of species.

Androctonus Ehrenberg, 1828 (29 species):

Androctonus aeneas C. L. Koch, 1839*
Androctonus afghanus Lourenço & Qi, 2006*
Androctonus aleksandrplotkini Lourenço & Qi, 2007*
Androctonus amoreuxi (Audouin, 1826)
Androctonus australis (Linnaeus, 1758)
Androctonus baluchicus (Pocock, 1900)*
Androctonus barbouri (Werner, 1932)*
Androctonus bicolor Ehrenberg, 1828
Androctonus cholistanus Kovarik & Ahmed, 2013*
Androctonus crassicauda (Olivier, 1807)
Androctonus dekeyseri Lourenço, 2005*
Androctonus donairei Rossi, 2015*
Androctonus eburneus (Pallary, 1928)*
Androctonus finitimus (Pocock, 1897)
Androctonus gonneti Vachon, 1948*
Androctonus hoggarensis (Pallary, 1929)
Androctonus liouvillei (Pallary, 1924)*
Androctonus maelfaiti Lourenço, 2005*
Androctonus mauritanicus (Pocock, 1902)
Androctonus maroccanus Lourenço, Ythier & Leguin, 2009*
Androctonus pallidus Lourenço, Duhem & Cloudsley-Thompson, 2012*
Androctonus robustus Kovarik & Ahmed, 2013*
Androctonus santi Lourenço, 2015*
Androctonus sergenti Vachon, 1948
Androctonus simonettai Rossi, 2015*
Androctonus tenuissimus Teruel, Kovarik & Turiel, 2013*
Androctonus tigrai Lourenço, Rossi & Sadine 2015*
Androctonus togolensis Lourenço, 2008*
Androctonus tropeai Rossi, 2015*

In captivity 

Despite the risks of keeping such a dangerously venomous species in captivity, Androctonus scorpions are frequently found in the exotic animal trade, A. amoreuxi and A. australis being the most commonly available. The fat-tailed scorpion's main diet when in captivity consists of cockroaches, grasshoppers, and crickets. Scorpions will generally try to kill and eat anything which moves and is smaller than themselves.

References

External links 
The Scorpion Files: Buthidae
Treatment of Androctonus stings at eMedicine
Treatment of Androctonus stings

Buthidae
Scorpions of Africa
Taxa named by Christian Gottfried Ehrenberg